The following are the association football events of the year 1893 throughout the world.

Events
July - Woolwich Arsenal, Liverpool and Newcastle United all admitted to the Football League
September - Woolwich Arsenal return to the Manor Ground from their three-year stay at the Invicta Ground.

Clubs formed in 1893

England
Gillingham F.C.
Headington (now Oxford United)
Royal Ordnance Factories
West Auckland Town F.C.
Whitby Town F.C.

Germany
VfB Stuttgart
VfB Einheit zu Pankow
1. FC Lokomotive Leipzig

Italy
Genoa C.F.C.

Portugal
FC Porto

Scotland
Dundee F.C.
Elgin City F.C.
Wick Academy F.C.

Switzerland
FC Basel

National champions

Argentina
Primera División Winners:
Lomas Athletic Club

Denmark
Football Tournament Winners:
Akademisk Boldklub

England
First Division Winners:
Sunderland
FA Cup Winners:
Wolverhampton Wanderers

Ireland
Football League Winners:
Linfield
Irish Cup Winners:
Linfield

Netherlands
Football League Winners:
Royal Haarlemsche

Scotland
First Division Winners:
Celtic
Scottish Cup Winners:
Queen's Park

Wales
Welsh Cup Winners:
Wrexham

International tournaments
1893 British Home Championship (February 25 – April 8, 1893)
England

Births
 7 March: Luitpold Popp, German international footballer (died 1968)

Deaths

Footnotes

 
Association football by year